Crossnore Presbyterian Church is a historic Presbyterian church on US 221/NC 194 east side, opposite the junction with Dellinger Road in Crossnore, Avery County, North Carolina. It was built between 1924 and 1926, and is a one-story, "T"-plan rock building with American Craftsman influences. Also on the property is a contributing stone arch (c. 1926) and non-contributing church cemetery established about 1929.

It was listed on the National Register of Historic Places in 1996.

References

External links

Presbyterian churches in North Carolina
Churches on the National Register of Historic Places in North Carolina
Churches completed in 1926
20th-century Presbyterian church buildings in the United States
Buildings and structures in Avery County, North Carolina
National Register of Historic Places in Avery County, North Carolina